Gather Me is a 1971 album released by Melanie and featuring the US Billboard Hot 100 Singles Chart #1 song "Brand New Key" (a novelty hit which also reached the #1 chart position in Canada, New Zealand and Australia between November 1971 and March 1972). The album also features the singles "Some Day I'll Be a Farmer" and the Top 40 hit "Ring the Living Bell". The album was certified Gold in the U.S. and was arranged by Roger Kellaway.

Track listing
All songs written by Melanie Safka; except where indicated
"Little Bit of Me"
"Some Day I'll Be a Farmer"
"Steppin'"
"Brand New Key"
"Ring Around the Moon"
"Ring the Living Bell"
"Railroad"
"Kansas"
"Some Say (I Got Devil)"
"Center of the Circle"
"What Wondrous Love" (Arranged and adapted by Melanie)
"Baby Day" 
"Tell Me Why" (Michael Edwards, Richard Parish, Sigmund Spaeth)

Personnel
Melanie - guitar, vocals
Sal DiTroica - acoustic and electric guitar
Don Payne - Fender electric bass
Roger Kellaway - piano, arrangements
Buddy Saltzman, Donald MacDonald, Robert J. Gregg - drums
Johnny Pacheco - congas
Toots Thielemans, Gilbert Chimes, Michael Chimes - harmonica
George Marge - woodwind
Artie Kaplan - contractor
Technical
Bruce Staple - engineer
Maddy Miller - photography

Charts

Singles

Certifications

References 

1971 albums
Melanie (singer) albums
Buddah Records albums
Neighborhood Records albums